Amit Singh is an Indian microbiologist and an associate professor at the department of microbiology and cell biology of the Indian Institute of Science. A Wellcome-DBT Senior Fellow, Singh is known for his studies on the pathogenesis of Mycobacterium tuberculosis. The Department of Biotechnology of the Government of India awarded him the National Bioscience Award for Career Development  for 2017/18. He was awarded with the prestigious CSIR- Shanti Swarup Bhatnagar award on 2021 for his phenomenal contributions in bio-scientific research. He received the 2021 Shanti Swarup Bhatnagar Prize for Science and Technology in Biological Science.

Biography 

Amit Singh was born on 18 March 1976. He graduated in science from the University of Delhi and earned his master's degree in biotechnology from the Indian Institute of Technology Roorkee in 1998. He then obtained a Ph.D. in 2004 under the guidance of Anil Kumar Tyagi at the South Campus of the University of Delhi, and  moved to the US for post-doctoral training at the laboratory of Adrie JC Steyn of the University of Alabama in Birmingham. On his return to India in 2010, he joined the International Centre for Genetic Engineering and Biotechnology as a Wellcome Trust-DBT intermediate fellow. In January 2014, he joined the Indian Institute of Science (IISc) at their department of microbiology and cell biology where he holds the position of an associate professor. He heads the Centre for Infectious Disease Research as its group leader, hosting several researchers who do research on the fundamental mechanisms of chronic human infections with special focus on Mycobacterium tuberculosis (Mtb) and human immunodeficiency virus (HIV).

Singh, has been a Wellcome Trust-DBT senior fellow since 2016. The Department of Biotechnology of the Government of India awarded him the National Bioscience Award for Career Development, one of the highest Indian science awards, for 2017/18.

Publications

Most cited articles at University of Alabama. 
   (Cited by 204  articles according to Google Scholar) (affiliation: University of Alabama at Birmingham)
  (Cited by 154  articles according to Google Scholar) (affiliation: University of Alabama at Birmingham)

Most cited articles at IIIT 
Ashima Bhaskar, Manbeena Chawla, Mansi Mehta, Pankti Parikh, Pallavi Chandra, Devayani Bhave, Dhiraj Kumar, Kate S Carroll, Amit Singh. Reengineering redox sensitive GFP to measure mycothiol redox potential of Mycobacterium tuberculosis during infection. 2014  PLOS Pathogens   10: 1 e1003902  (Cited by 88 articles according to Google Scholar) (affiliation: IIT)
Rufai SB, Kumar P, Singh A, Prajapati S, Balooni V, Singh S. Comparison of Xpert MTB/RIF with line probe assay for detection of rifampin-monoresistant Mycobacterium tuberculosis. Journal of clinical microbiology. 2014 Jun 1;52(6):1846-52. (Cited by 76 articles according to Google Scholar) (affiliation: IIT):
Chawla M, Parikh P, Saxena A, Munshi M, Mehta M, Mai D, Srivastava AK, Narasimhulu KV, Redding KE, Vashi N, Kumar D.  Adrie J C Steyn  and Amit Singh Mycobacterium tuberculosis WhiB4 regulates oxidative stress response to modulate survival and dissemination in vivo. Molecular microbiology. 2012 Sep;85(6):1148-65. (Cited by 56 articles according to Google Scholar) (affiliation: IIT):

References

Further reading

External links 

 http://cidr.iisc.ac.in/amit/ Official home page at IISC

Indian scientific authors
Year of birth missing (living people)
N-BIOS Prize recipients
Indian immunologists
Indian microbiologists
Indian virologists
Academic staff of the Indian Institute of Science
Delhi University alumni
IIT Roorkee alumni
University of Alabama at Birmingham alumni
Living people